HMS Tumult was a T-class destroyer built for the Royal Navy during the Second World War.

Description
She was powered by two Parsons geared steam turbines, each driving one propeller shaft, using steam provided by two Admiralty three-drum boilers. Her complement was 170 officers and ratings.

The ship was armed with four 45-calibre 4.7-inch (120 mm) Mark XII guns in dual-purpose mounts. For anti-aircraft (AA) defence, Tumult had one twin mount for Bofors 40 mm guns and four twin  Oerlikon autocannon. She was fitted with two above-water quadruple mounts for  torpedoes. Two depth charge rails and four throwers were fitted for which 70 depth charges were provided.

Second World War

Construction and career
In 1946, Tumult was placed into reserve at Portsmouth. She remained in reserve until 1953 when was converted by Grayson Rollo at Birkenhead, into a Type 16 fast anti-submarine frigate, with the new pennant number F121. She emerged from the conversion in 1954. In November 1956 she was part of the 2nd Training Squadron at Portsmouth. Between December 1957 and December 1960 she was part of the Chatham reserve. From December 1960 until October 1965 she was part of the Rosyth reserve.

Following sale for scrap she was taken to Arnott Young at Dalmuir for breaking up, where she arrived on 25 October 1965.

References

Bibliography

External links
 Naval-History.net HMS Tumult

 

S and T-class destroyers
Ships built on the River Clyde
1942 ships
World War II destroyers of the United Kingdom
Cold War destroyers of the United Kingdom
Type 16 frigates
Cold War frigates of the United Kingdom